Curt van de Sandt (28 June 1885 – 3 August 1930) was a Dutch bobsledder. He competed in the four-man event at the 1928 Winter Olympics.

References

1885 births
1930 deaths
Dutch male bobsledders
Olympic bobsledders of the Netherlands
Bobsledders at the 1928 Winter Olympics
Sportspeople from Hamburg